Screw (typeset as SCREW) was a Japanese visual kei rock band formed in March 2006 by vocalist Byou and Yuuto, who were previously in the band Joker before its disbandment.

Biography

2011-present: Biran, Going Major and Xanadu Seventh Heaven Tour
In 2011, Screw released two new singles, which were later included on their fifth studio album, Biran, released on February 15, 2012.

The single "Deep Six" reached number 23 on the Oricon charts and number 1 on the Indies chart. The single "Brainstorm" reached number 30 on Oricon charts and number 1 on the Indies chart.

Their fifth studio album was released on February 15, 2012. It immediately reached number 3 on the Indies chart. Within its first week, the album reached number 42 on the Oricon chart.

Screw announced that they are to go major with the release of their new single "Xanadu", set to come out on October 17. The group will start a one-man tour, Xanadu -Seventh Heaven...- on the same day at Shibuya O-West with a tour final date at Osaka Muse on December 9.

Titled Teardrop, the single will be released on February 6. There are currently no more details available, but more information is expected to be revealed closer to the single's release. Screw have also announced a short one-man tour for 2013, titled Screw 7th Anniversary Live Neverending Breath. The tour will start on April 13 at Osaka Muse and end on April 20 at Shibuya-AX, for a total of three dates.

They covered hide's song "Dice" for Tribute III -Visual Spirits-, released on July 3, 2013.

Former members
  – lead vocals (2006–2016)
  – leader, lead guitar, backing vocals (2006–2016)
  – rhythm guitar, backing vocals (2007–2016)
  – drums, percussion,  (2006–2016)
  – bass, backing vocals (2009–2014)
  – bass, backing vocals (2006–2009)

Discography

Albums

Singles

References

External links
  

Visual kei musical groups
Japanese hard rock musical groups
Japanese alternative metal musical groups
Japanese metalcore musical groups
Musical groups established in 2006
Tokuma Japan Communications artists